Gordon Strachan (born 1957) is a Scottish football manager and former player.

Gordon Strachan may also refer to:
Gordon Strachan (minister) (1934–2010), Church of Scotland minister, theologian, university lecturer and author
Gordon Strachan (rugby union) (born 1947), Scottish rugby union player
Gordon C. Strachan (born 1943), political aide